Senecio species are used as food plants by the caterpillars of a number of Lepidoptera species including:

Arctiidae

 Amerila leucoptera – Afrotropical
 Amerila pannosa – Afrotropical
 Arctia caja, garden tiger – recorded on Senecio jacobaea in the Nearctic
 Diacrisia scita – recorded on Senecio bupleuroides in Southern Africa
 Dysschema picta – recorded on Senecio brasiliensis in Brazil
 Dysschema sacrifica – recorded on Senecio brasiliensis in Brazil
 Estigmene acrea – recorded on Senecio jacobaea in the Nearctic
 Eurata helena – recorded on Senecio brasiliensis in Brazil
 Eurata strigiventris – recorded on Senecio brasiliensis in Brazil
 Galtara doriae – Afrotropical
 Galtara extensa – Madagascar - also introduced to Hawaii for biological control of Senecio madagascariensis
 Grammia williamsii – Nearctic
 Hypercompe indecisa – recorded on Senecio crassiflorus in Brazil
 Hypercompe orsa – recorded on Senecio brasiliensis in Brazil
 Metarctia crassa – recorded on Senecio pterophorus in South Africa
 Metarctia lateritia – East Africa
 Nyctemera adversata – Oriental
 Nyctemera amicus, senecio or magpie moth – Australasia
 Nyctemera annulata – recorded on Senecio glomeratus in New Zealand
 Nyctemera apicalis – Afrotropical
 Nyctemera calcicola – Oriental
 Nyctemera itakina – Afrotropical
 Nyctemera itokina – East Africa
 Nyctemera lacticinia – Oriental; on Senecio edgworthii in India
 Nyctemera leuconoe – recorded on Senecio madagascariensis in southern Africa; Senecio syringifolius in the Afrotropics
 Nyctemera restrictum – Afrotropical
 Paracles fusca – recorded on Senecio brasiliensis in Brazil
 Platyprepia virginalis – recorded on Senecio jacobaea in the United States
 Rhodogastria amasis – Afrotropical; Southern Africa
 Rhodogastria similis – recorded on Senecio pterophorus in South Africa
 Saenura flava – Afrotropical; southern Africa
 Spilosoma glatignyi – Australia
 Spilosoma lutea, buff ermine – recorded on Senecio jacobaea in Europe
 Tyria jacobaeae, cinnabar moth – recorded on Senecio jacobaea, Senecio vulgaris and Senecio congestus (cosmopolitan)

Bucculatricidae
 Bucculatrix eurotiella – Nearctic
 Bucculatrix seneciensis – Nearctic

Choreutidae
 Asterivora combinatana – recorded on Senecio bellidioides in Australasia
 Caloreas augustella – recorded on Senecio triangularis in the Nearctic

Crambidae
 Scoparia pyralella – UK (unconfirmed)

Geometridae

 Eupithecia absinthiata, wormwood pug – Holarctic; Senecio jacobaea in the British Isles
 Eupithecia bivittata – recorded on Senecio jacobaea in the United States
 Eupithecia coagulata – Nearctic; Senecio jacobaea in the US
 Eupithecia miserulata, common eupithecia – recorded on Senecio jacobaea in Nearctic
 Eupithecia subumbrata, shaded pug – recorded on Senecio jacobaea in the British Isles
 Eupithecia virgaureata, golden-rod pug – recorded on Senecio jacobaea in the British Isles
 Microsema gladiaria – recorded on Senecio brasiliensis in Brazil
 Orthonama obstipata, gem – Nearctic; Finland; Senecio vulgaris in the British Isles
 Sabulodes caberata – recorded on Senecio vulgaris in the Nearctic
 Xanthorhoe munitata – Nearctic

Gracillariidae
 Acrocercops breyeri – recorded on Senecio bonariensis in Argentina
 Phyllocnistis finitima – Nearctic
 Phyllocnistis insignis – recorded on Senecio aureus in Nearctic

Lasiocampidae
 Artace litterata – recorded on Senecio brasiliensis in Brazil
 Bombycopsis bipars – recorded on Senecio deltoideus in Southern Africa
 Bombycopsis indecora – East Africa

Lycaenidae
 Calephelis borealis – recorded on Senecio obovatus in the Nearctic
 Trimenia wallengrenii, Wallengren's copper – Afrotropical

Nepticulidae
 Ectoedemia erythrogenella – recorded on Senecio nemorensis in Cyprus

Noctuidae

 Autoplusia olivacea – recorded on Senecio grandifolius in the Nearctic; Senecio jacobaea in the United States
 Cerastis rubricosa, red chestnut – recorded on Senecio vulgaris in the British Isles
 Condica conducta – Madagascar
 Eumichtis lichenea – Palaearctic
 Heliothis peltigera, bordered straw – Old World; Senecio viscosus in the British Isles
 Lacanobia oleracea, bright-line brown-eye – Finland
 Orthosia opima, northern drab – recorded on Senecio jacobaea in the British Isles
 Naenia typica, gothic – (flowers) UK
 Papaipema insulidens – recorded on Senecio hydrophilus in the Nearctic
 Phlogophora meticulosa, angle shades – Palaearctic
 Polymixis flavicincta, large rananculus – Finland
 Trichoplusia exquisita – recorded on Senecio bupleuroides in Southern Africa
 Trichoplusia ni, cabbage looper – recorded on Senecio hybridus and Senecio mikanioides in the Nearctic
 Xestia c-nigrum, setaceous Hebrew character – recorded on Senecio vulgaris in Nearctic
 Xestia collina – recorded on Senecio nemorensis in Germany

Nymphalidae

 Actinote pellenea – recorded on Senecio bonariensis in Argentina; Senecio brasiliensis in Brazil
 Actinote perisa – recorded on Senecio bonariensis in Argentina
 Charidryas palla – recorded on Senecio triangularis in the Nearctic
 Vanessa cardui, painted lady – recorded on Jacobaea maritima (cosmopolitan)
 Vanessa virginiensis, American painted lady – recorded on Jacobaea maritima in the New World

Oecophoridae
 Agonopterix canadensis – recorded on Senecio serra in the Nearctic
 Agonopterix cinerariae – recorded on Senecio halimifolius, Senecio appendiculatus, Senecio tussilaginis in the Canary Islands
 Agonopterix cotoneastri – recorded on Senecio fluviatilis in the Palaearctic
 Agonopterix dammersi – recorded on Senecio flaccidus in the Nearctic
 Agonopterix fusciterminella – recorded on Senecio aronicoides in the Nearctic
 Agonopterix senecionella – recorded on Senecio aureus in the Nearctic

Pterophoridae

 Emmelina monodactyla – Nearctic
 Hellinsia chrysocomae – British Isles
 Hellinsia osteodactylus – British Isles
 Oidaematophorus lacteodactylus – recorded on Senecio vulgaris in the United States
 Platyptilia calodactyla – Palaearctic
 Platyptilia farfarellus – recorded on Senecio vernalis in Europe
 Platyptilia isodactyla – recorded on Senecio aquaticus in Europe
 Platyptilia nemoralis – recorded on Senecio fluviatilis and Senecio nemorensis in Europe
 Platyptilia williamsii – recorded on Senecio aronicoides and Senecio jacobaea in the US

Pyralidae
 Ephestiodes gilvescentella – recorded on Senecio blochmaniae in the Nearctic
 Homoeosoma sp. – Madagascar
 Homoeosoma electella – recorded on Senecio flaccidus in the Nearctic
 Homoeosoma nebulella – recorded on Senecio jacobaea in the British Isles
 Homoeosoma nimbella – Palaearctic
 Homoeosoma oconequensis – recorded on Senecio inaequidens in Colombia
 Homoeosoma vagella – Australasia
 Ostrinia orientalis – recorded on Senecio cannabifolius in Palaearctic
 Patagoniodes farinaria – recorded on Senecio jacobaea in Australasia
 Perinephela lancealis – British Isles
 Phycitodes sp. – recorded on Senecio madagascariensis in Madagascar
 Phycitodes carlinella – Palaearctic
 Phycitodes maritima – recorded on Senecio jacobaea in the British Isles
 Phycitodes saxicola – recorded on (flowers and seedheads of) Senecio jacobaea in the UK
 Scoparia pyralella – recorded on Senecio jacobaea in the British Isles
 Udea uliginosalis – recorded on Senecio jacobaea in the British Isles

Saturniidae
 Ludia delegorguei – recorded on Senecio deltoideus in the Afrotropics; Southern Africa

Scythrididae
 Areniscythris brachypteris – recorded on Senecio blochmaniae in the United States

Tortricidae

 Argyrotaenia citrana – recorded on Senecio jacobaea in the Nearctic
 Cnephasia conspersana – Europe
 Cnephasia genitalana – Europe
 Cochylis atricapitana – recorded on Senecio jacobaea in the Palaearctic
 Cochylis dubitana – (inside flowers and developing seedheads) Palaearctic
 Commophila aeneana – recorded on (roots of) Senecio jacobaea in the Palaearctic
 Deltinea costalimai – recorded on Senecio bonariensis in Argentina
 Eana osseana – Nearctic
 Epiblema costipunctana – recorded (inside stems and roots of) Senecio jacobaea in the British Isles
 Epiblema hepaticana – recorded on Senecio nemorensis in the Palaearctic
 Epiblema trigeminana – recorded on Senecio jacobaea in the Palaearctic
 Epiphyas sobriana – Oriental
 Eucosma campoliliana – recorded on (seeds and stems of) Senecio jacobaea in the British Isles
 Eucosma nigromaculana – recorded on Senecio jacobaea in the Palaearctic
 Lobesia sp. – recorded on Senecio madagascariensis in Madagascar
 Lobesia cinerariae – recorded on Jacobaea maritima in the Palaearctic
 Lobesia yasudai – recorded on Jacobaea cannabifolia in Japan
 Merophyas divulsana, lucerne leaf roller – Australia
 Phalonidia curvistrigana – recorded on Senecio nemorensis in Europe
 Phaneta elongana – recorded on Senecio serra in the Nearctic
 Platynota stultana – recorded on Senecio jacobaea in the Nearctic
 Sonia vovana – recorded on Senecio flaccidus in the Nearctic
 Sparganothis senecionana – Nearctic
 Syndemis musculana – UK

References

External links

Senecio
+Lepidoptera